Chris Llewellyn is an American poet.

Life
Llewellyn graduated from Warren Wilson College.

Her work has appeared in Pudding House.

She married a Justice Department lawyer, Edward Bordley. They live in northeast Washington, D.C., and have a daughter, Elizabeth Bordley.

Awards
 1986 Walt Whitman Award

Works

Poetry
 
 
  chapbook

Anthologies

References

External links
 

Year of birth missing (living people)
Living people
Poets from Washington, D.C.
Warren Wilson College alumni
American women poets
21st-century American women writers